Michael Evelyn Adams (31 May 1920 – 6 February 2005) was a British journalist who worked for the BBC.

Life
Born in Addis Ababa, Michael Adams studied at Christ Church, Oxford. During the Second World War, he was shot down over the North Sea while serving with the Royal Air Force and was a prisoner of war in Germany for the rest of the conflict. He subsequently became a journalist, and was Middle East correspondent for The Guardian from 1956 to 1962, when he took a year's sabbatical in Italy. He subsequently continued to keep up association with The Guardian as a freelance journalist.

Adams was almost the only British journalist to report on Israel's treatment of Palestinians in 1967. He helped found the Council for the Advancement of Arab-British Understanding (CAABU) in 1967, and served as its first Director. He was editor of Middle East International until 1981. In 1975 he and Christopher Mayhew wrote Publish It Not: The Middle East Cover-Up, a pro-Palestinian work on the Middle East conflict.

References

1920 births
2005 deaths
Alumni of Christ Church, Oxford
BBC newsreaders and journalists
British expatriates in Ethiopia
British male journalists
British World War II prisoners of war
People from Addis Ababa
The Guardian journalists
Shot-down aviators
Royal Air Force personnel of World War II
World War II prisoners of war held by Germany